The 2018 Netball Superleague season was the thirteenth season of the Netball Superleague, the elite domestic netball competition in the United Kingdom.

Overview

Format
The format was the same as the previous season, with a double round-robin structure utilised. The top four teams qualify for the semi-finals, with the winners of these matches meeting in the grand final.

Teams

Results

Regular season
 To read scores and statistics from all matches throughout the season click here.

Ladder

Grand Final

 Player of the match: Rachel Dunn (Wasps)
 The match was a re-match of their 2017 Grand Final and was won by an identical scoreline.

References

 
2018
2018 in English netball
2018 in Welsh women's sport
2018 in Scottish women's sport